The Island of A Toxa, La Toxa Grande, the Island of Louxo or the Island of the Baths of Louxo (in Galician Illa da Toxa) is a Spanish island belonging to the province of Pontevedra, in Galicia. The island is located east of the small town of O Grove, to which it is connected by an 18th-century bridge It has a small urban centre called Isla de la Toja, belonging to the civil parish of San Martín, which had 42 inhabitants in 2018. It has an area of 110 hectares and is located about 30 km from Pontevedra.

Name 

The island is traditionally given the original Galician names, illa de Louxo or illa da Toxa Grande; the latter name was devised to differentiate the name of this island from that of the island of La Toja Pequeña (illa da Toxa Pequena), which is located about 100 metres east of La Toja Grande.

Etymology 
The name Toja has been explained as a pre-Roman hydronym derived from the Indo-European base *Tŭg-, more precisely *Tŭgia "muddy place", in reference to the therapeutic mud of the thermal springs that characterise the island of La Toja. This reference hides the etymology of Louxo, the other name of the island, which since the middle of the 20th century is derived from Lausio, from the Indo-European root *leu-, *lau- "to wash, to wash oneself", in reference to its very ancient thermal springs.

History 
For centuries, the island was used by the inhabitants of O Grove as a place to graze their cattle (which they transported by boat) and also for their agricultural work. But following the rediscovery in the 19th century of its thermal mud (from which it takes the name La Toja) and medicinal waters (from which it takes the name Louxo), it became privately owned to exploit its thermal advantages, building the old spa, which brought with it a spectacular increase in tourism and the birth of other facilities.

In 1989, the island hosted the annual meeting of the Bilderberg influence group, which brings together the political and financial elites of the wider world.

Spa centre 
It is one of the most famous islands in Galicia due to its vocation as a spa, leisure and tourism centre: it has thermal baths, old soap and cosmetics factories, luxury hotels, a golf course, a marina, a congress centre, the first casino in Spain, tennis courts, padel courts, archery courts, swimming pools, housing estates, a shopping centre and other facilities. However, the centre of the island still retains a dense pine forest. Thus, the island is divided into : 32 hectares of private housing estates (its southern part and the eastern and western flanks), 25 hectares of golf course for private use (its entire northern part) and 25 hectares of virgin pine forest (in the centre of the island).

Chapel 

The island has a characteristic chapel dedicated to Saint Caralampio and the Virgin of Carmen, whose original plan dates back to the 12th century and which is now completely covered with scallops.

Tourism 
On this island, there are several recreational opportunities, including boating along the ria. The boats are catamarans whose keels are fitted with a special glass so that the marine fauna can be seen. On the route, a mussel farm is visited and its operation for cultivating mussels is explained.

The island Gran Hotel is a good architectural example of the Belle Époque style.

Gallery

References

See also

Related articles 
 Province of Pontevedra
 Rías Baixas
 Balneario da Toxa
 Spa town
 Thermal bath

External links 
 

Islands of the North Atlantic Ocean
Geography of Galicia (Spain)
Islands of Spain
Spa towns in Spain
Tourism in Galicia (Spain)
Islands of Galicia (Spain)
Landforms of Galicia (Spain)
Tourist attractions in Galicia (Spain)